Francis Byrne may refer to:

 Francis John Byrne (1934–2017), Irish historian
 Francis Byrne (politician) (1877–1938), former member of the Legislative Assembly of Quebec
 Francis Barry Byrne, architect
Francis Byrne (Australian politician), New South Wales politician
Francis Byrne (rugby union), played for England in 1897 Home Nations Championship

See also
Frank Byrne (disambiguation)
Francis Burns (disambiguation)